Stopka is a surname. Notable people with this surname include:
 Czesława Stopka (1937–2021), Polish cross-country skier
 Józef Stopka (born 1942), Polish biathlete

See also
 

Polish-language surnames